Gilberton is a borough in Schuylkill County, Pennsylvania, United States, four miles (7 km) west by south of Mahanoy City.  Its population was 583 at the 2020 census, a decline from the figure of 769 tabulated in 2010.  Extensive deposits of anthracite coal are in the region, and coal-mining had been practiced by many of the 4,373 people who lived there in 1900.  The coal-mining industry was thriving in 1910, and 5,401 people lived in Gilberton.

Etymology
Gilberton is named for John Gilbert, a coal mine owner.

Geography
Gilberton is located at  (40.797496, -76.225781).

The borough is made up of three small villages, Mahanoy Plane, Maizeville and Gilberton proper.

Demographics

As of the census of 2000, there were 867 people, 385 households, and 219 families residing in the borough. The population density was 608.3 people per square mile (234.1/km2). There were 474 housing units at an average density of 332.6 per square mile (128.0/km2). The racial makeup of the borough was 97.92% White, 0.35% Native American, 1.61% Asian, and 0.12% from two or more races. Hispanic or Latino of any race were 0.35% of the population.

There were 385 households, out of which 23.6% had children under the age of 18 living with them, 42.3% were married couples living together, 10.9% had a female householder with no husband present, and 43.1% were non-families. 40.3% of all households were made up of individuals, and 22.3% had someone living alone who was 65 years of age or older. The average household size was 2.25 and the average family size was 3.10.

In the borough the population was spread out, with 21.8% under the age of 18, 6.8% from 18 to 24, 29.3% from 25 to 44, 22.6% from 45 to 64, and 19.5% who were 65 years of age or older. The median age was 40 years. For every 100 females, there were 100.2 males. For every 100 women age 18 and over, there were 98.2 men.

The median income for a household in the borough was $24,792, and the median income for a family was $34,500. Males had a median income of $27,875 versus $21,000 for females. The per capita income for the borough was $14,785. About 9.5% of families and 10.6% of the population were below the poverty line, including 12.4% of those under age 18 and 7.7% of those age 65 or over.

Gilberton Coal Company
Gilberton Coal Company was founded in 1940 by John B. Rich. It is located on the eastern edge of the borough on Gilberton Road and is still in operation.

Gallery

References

Populated places established in 1873
Municipalities of the Anthracite Coal Region of Pennsylvania
Boroughs in Schuylkill County, Pennsylvania
Coal towns in Pennsylvania
1873 establishments in Pennsylvania
Ukrainian communities in the United States